Abuelito Huenteao or Taita Huenteao is a character very important in the mythology of the Huilliche of San Juan de la Costa. Several versions exists on the history of Abuelito Huenteao. One of these says he was a healer who travelled the lands of the Huilliche helping people before finally settling on the rocks of Pucatrihue. Other versions says he settled at the sea because he followed his wife who was a mermaid (Spanish: sirena). 

Grammatically Abuelito Huenteao is a composite of Spanish and Huilliche language meaning "Granpa Huenteao".

References

Mapuche gods
Messenger gods
Tutelary gods
Los Lagos Region
Huilliche
Chilean legends
Mapuche legends